Falkenberg is a town in the Elbe-Elster district, in southwestern Brandenburg, Germany. It is situated near the river Schwarze Elster, 16 km east of Torgau, and 13 km northwest of Bad Liebenwerda.

History
It was first mentioned in 1251. In 1547 the Battle of Mühlberg was decided in the vicinity of Falkenberg when the Saxon prince-elector Johann Friedrich I. was taken prisoner. The village itself remained of low importance until the 19th century. The manor changed hands several times, until it was bought by the municipality in 1911. From 1815 to 1944, Falkenberg was part of the Prussian Province of Saxony. In 1848, Falkenberg (Elster) station was opened on the railway Jüterbog–Röderau railway. The Halle–Cottbus railway was opened in 1872 and crossed the former at Falkenberg which became a major junction and grew considerably. Industry and businesses were established, including a power station. World War II caused major destruction. From 1944 to 1945, Falkenberg was part of the Province of Halle-Merseburg. From 1952 to 1990, it was part of the Bezirk Cottbus of East Germany. In 1962 Falkenberg was awarded town privileges. The coat of arms reflects the major branches of economy in the town: energy supply, railway, and agriculture.

Large numbers of derelict steam locomotives are stored at an old railway depot just to the north-east.

Demography

Sons and daughters of the city 

 Ernst Hildebrand (1833–1924), painter
 Emil Winkler (1835–1888), engineer
 Lothar Schneider (born 1943), cartoonist
 Robert Zickert (born 1990), footballer

Other personalities associated with the city 

 Steffen Blochwitz (born 1967), cyclist

References

Localities in Elbe-Elster